Rik van de Westelaken (born 22 April 1971) is a Dutch television presenter. He is known for presenting television programs which include the NOS Journaal, Peking Express and Wie is de Mol?. Other programs include Rik over de Grens and 5 Golden Rings.

Career 

He appeared as news presenter in the 2008 film Summer Heat and as himself in the 2009 film Spion van Oranje.

, he presents the current affairs television programme EenVandaag.

In 2019, he succeeded Art Rooijakkers as presenter of the popular television show Wie is de Mol?. Van de Westelaken participated as contestant in the show in 2015 and he ended up winning the show. In 2020, he presented both the 20th season of Wie is de Mol? and a special anniversary season called Wie is de Mol? Renaissance which celebrates the 20th anniversary of the show. In 2021, he presented the 21st season of the show, which is his fourth season as host. He also presented the 22nd season and 23rd season of the show.

Filmography

As presenter 

 Wie is de Mol? (2019 – )

As contestant 

 Wie is de Mol? (2015)

References

External links 

 

1971 births
Living people
Dutch game show hosts
People from Vlaardingen
21st-century Dutch people